Leesburg may refer to several locations in the United States of America:

Leesburg, Alabama
Leesburg, Florida
Leesburg, Georgia
Leesburg, Idaho, a community and historic district listed on the NRHP in Lemhi County, Idaho
Leesburg, Illinois
Leesburg, Indiana
Leesburg Historic District (Leesburg, Indiana), listed on the NRHP in Kosciusko County, Indiana
Leesburg, Kentucky
Leesburg, Mississippi
Leesburg, New Jersey
Leesburg, Ohio
Leesburg, Texas
Leesburg, Virginia
Leesburg Historic District (Leesburg, Virginia), NRHP-listed

See also
Leesburg Historic District (disambiguation)